The 1992 World Junior Figure Skating Championships were held from November 26 to December 1, 1991 in Hull, Quebec, Canada. The event was sanctioned by the International Skating Union and open to ISU member nations. Medals were awarded in the disciplines of men's singles, ladies' singles, pair skating, and ice dancing.

Medal table

Results

Men

Ladies

Pairs

Ice dancing

References

 German figure skating magazin "Pirouette" 26th year's issues, January 1992, No. 1

World Junior Figure Skating Championships
World Junior Figure Skating Championships, 1992
1991 in figure skating
Figure skating
World Junior 1992